"Miracle Love" is a song by Australian musician Matt Corby, released in February 2019 as the fourth and final single from his second studio album, Rainbow Valley. A live version was released on 8 March 2019.

In a discussion with ABC, Corby said he originally didn't like the song, believing it was "too basic" before reworking it. He said is particularly proud of the drums in this song.

In December 2019, the song won first place in the Vanda & Young Global Songwriting Competition.

At the APRA Music Awards of 2020, the song was nominated for Most Performed Alternate Work of the Year.

Music video
The live music video was released on 26 February 2019.

Reception
Mixdown Mag said "'Miracle Love' sees the Australian musical extraordinaire channel his inner D'Angelo on the soulful track. Packed with dense vocal harmonies and staggered neo-soul grooves, 'Miracle Love' goes the distance to exemplify Corby's insane talent as a songwriter and performer."

Charts

Certifications

References

2019 singles
2018 songs
Matt Corby songs
Songs written by Dann Hume
Vanda & Young Global Songwriting Competition Winning Songs